Thubten Kunga Ling  Center (TKC), is a Buddhist Center in Deerfield Beach, Florida.  TKC follows the Gelugpa tradition of Tibetan Buddhism, which is the lineage of the Dalai Lama.  The center offers classes on meditation and Buddhist philosophy.
We are a non-profit, volunteer based organization located in Deerfield Beach, Florida. Our programs present Tibetan Buddhist teachings in an authentic and traditional manner. At the same time, we show how the teachings of the Buddha help us navigate our world today. Our goal is to help students achieve their maximum potential for wisdom, happiness, and compassion.
Tubten Kunga Center is located at 201 SE 15th Terrace, Suite 206, Deerfield Beach, Florida 33441

History

Tubten Kunga Center was founded in 1994 by Jacqueline Keeley. TKC then became part of the Foundation for the Preservation of the Mahayana Tradition, the international network of Tibetan Buddhist centers founded by the Lama Thubten Yeshe and Lama Thubten Zopa Rinpoche.

Mission

Our programs present Tibetan Buddhist teachings in an authentic and traditional manner, but with a focus on applying the wisdom of the Buddha within modern mentalities and our lived experiences today.

Our organization is based on the Buddhist tradition of Lama Tsongkhapa of Tibet as taught to us by our founders Lama Thubten Yeshe and Lama Thubten Zopa Rinpoche. We’re affiliated with the Foundation for the Preservation of the Mahayana Tradition (FPMT), an organization devoted to preserving and spreading Mahayana Buddhism worldwide by creating opportunities to listen, reflect, meditate, practice and actualize the unmistaken teachings of the Buddha.

Method
We believe that a combination of study, practice, and ritual is the optimal way to transform the mind into a positive force for kindness, compassion, and wisdom.
Following the advice of Lama Zopa Rinpoche, spiritual director of the FPMT, we present an engaging selection of classes to suit all levels of interest and effort.
Most importantly, we try to inspire students to take what they learn into their hearts and carry it into their everyday lives. At work, at home, in the community, even in traffic – we help students cultivate the tools for a happier life and a more peaceful environment.

External links 
Tubten Kunga Center's official website and events calendar
Foundation for the Preservation of the Mahayana Tradition's site

Buddhist temples in Florida
Buddhist organizations
Deerfield Beach, Florida
1994 establishments in Florida
Religious organizations established in 1994